Emanuelle and the White Slave Trade is an Italian sexploitation film from 1978 directed by Joe D'Amato as his last Black Emanuelle film. It was also known as Emanuelle and the Girls of Madame Claude.

Plot
Emanuelle is in Kenya to arrange an interview with the Italian American gangster George Lagnetti ("Giorgio Rivetti" in the English dub). She succeeds in meeting him with help from her friend Susan Towers and Prince Aurozanni but is intrigued by other events, leading her to meet the white slave trader Francis Harley, and setting her up for a dangerous undercover operation at the San Diego mansion of Madame Claude, which functions as a brothel for top-level dignitaries and civil servants.

Cast
 Laura Gemser as Emanuelle
 Ely Galleani as Susan Towers 
 Gabriele Tinti as Francis Harley 
 Venantino Venantini as Giorgio Rivetti 
 Pierre Marfurt as Prince Arausani 
 Gota Gobert as Madame Claude
 Nicola D'Eramo as Stefan
 Bryan Rostron as Jim Barnes

Background
Emanuelle and the White Slave Trade features the investigative journalist character known to her readers as 'Emanuelle' (Laura Gemser). Like most films directed or produced by Joe D'Amato, it is an attempt to capitalise on the commercial success of another film - in this case the 1977 film The French Woman. The film is one of the Black Emanuelle films with the heaviest censorship, eight minutes cut in a theatrical release.

Release
Emanuelle and the White Slave Trade was released in Italy on April 20, 1978.

Reception
In a contemporary review, John Pym (Monthly Film Bulletin) "a flimsy, though surprisingly unsensational, yarn supposedly concerned with the horrors of 'white slavery'. The dismal artifice of the whole severely tests the viewer's patience."

References

External links 
 
 Emanuelle and the White Slave Trade at Variety Distribution

1978 films
Films directed by Joe D'Amato
Italian sexploitation films
1970s Italian-language films
Italian crime films
Films set in Kenya
Films set in New York City
Films set in San Diego
Emanuelle
Italian LGBT-related films
Films scored by Nico Fidenco
1970s Italian films
1970s French films